Carlo Simionato (born 1 July 1961 in Ravenna) is a retired Italian sprinter who specialised in the 100 and 200 metres.

He won seven medals at the International athletics competitions, all of these with national relays team.

Biography
At the World Championships in Helsinki in 1983 he finished seventh in the 200 metres final and won a silver medal with the relay team. He also finished fourth in 4 × 100 m relay at the 1982 European Championships, and won a bronze medal in 200 m at the 1983 Mediterranean Games.

On the national level he was the Italian 200 metres champion in 1982 and 1985, as well as 100 metres champion in 1985. He won the Italian indoor 200 metres in 1984. His personal best 200 metres time was 20.53 seconds, achieved in August 1983 in Riccione. His personal best 100 metres time was 10.34 seconds, achieved in July 1985 in Ravenna.

Achievements

National titles
He has won 4 times the individual national championship.
1 win in the 100 metres (1985)
2 wins in the 200 metres (1982, 1985)
1 win in the 200 metres indoor (1984)

See also
 Italian all-time lists - 200 metres
 Italy national relay team

References

External links
 

1961 births
Living people
Sportspeople from Ravenna
Italian male sprinters
Athletes (track and field) at the 1984 Summer Olympics
Olympic athletes of Italy
World Athletics Championships medalists
World Athletics Championships athletes for Italy
Mediterranean Games gold medalists for Italy
Mediterranean Games bronze medalists for Italy
Mediterranean Games medalists in athletics
Athletes (track and field) at the 1983 Mediterranean Games
Athletes (track and field) at the 1991 Mediterranean Games
Italian Athletics Championships winners
20th-century Italian people